Hyloxalus sylvaticus is a species of frog in the family Dendrobatidae. It is endemic to northern Peru and found on the Amazonian slopes of the Eastern Andes and in the Huancabamba Depression. Its range might extend to Ecuador.
Its natural habitats are cloud forests. It is active along streams by day and can hide under rocks within and along streams at night. It is threatened by habitat loss in parts of its range.

References

sylvaticus
Amphibians of the Andes
Amphibians of Peru
Endemic fauna of Peru
Amphibians described in 1920
Taxonomy articles created by Polbot